Karl Georg Albrecht Ernst von Hake (8 August 1768 – 19 May 1835) was a Prussian general and Minister of War.

Biography
Hake was born on the estate of  Flatow (now part of Kremmen) in the Margraviate of Brandenburg. He entered the Prussian Army in 1785. In 1793, while serving under the command of Charles William Ferdinand, Duke of Brunswick, he distinguished himself in the Battle of Pirmasens during the French Revolutionary Wars against France. For his actions he was later to be decorated, on 3 April 1814, with the Pour le Mérite medal with Oak leaves.

Hake was appointed to a post in the War Ministry in 1809, and
served as Minister of War from 17 June 1810 until August 1813 when he was replaced by Boyen (during which time he attracted much attention by his efficient preparations for war). Subsequently, commanded a brigade in the Prussian IV Corps (Bülow's) with rank of major-general, and played a distinguished part in the Battle of Waterloo.

In 1819 Hake was again appointed Minister of War. King Frederick William III of Prussia ordered him to conduct experiments into the use of the optical telegraph. Hake, however, was opposed to optical telegraphy and devised several means of preventing the experiments from being implemented. He successfully delayed the experiments until May 1830. Hake finally left the War Ministry in 1833 and died two years later, in 1835, at Naples, Italy.

Notes

References

Further reading
 
 
 

|-

|-

1768 births
1835 deaths
People from Oberhavel
Prussian commanders of the Napoleonic Wars
People from the Margraviate of Brandenburg
Prussian politicians
Recipients of the Pour le Mérite (military class)
Generals of Infantry (Prussia)
Knights Cross of the Military Order of Maria Theresa
Military personnel from Brandenburg